

Events

January events
 January 9 – The Østfold Line in Norway takes electric traction into use between Ås and Dilling.
 January 14 – Atchison, Topeka and Santa Fe Railway discontinues the San Francisco-Los Angeles-Chicago Navajo.
 January 27 – The Boston, Revere Beach and Lynn Railroad ceases operations in Massachusetts in preparation for abandonment.
 January 29 – Three gasoline-powered trains carrying factory workers crash and explode while approaching Ajikawaguchi Station, Yumesaki Line (Nishinari Line), Osaka, Japan, killing at least 181 people and injuring at least 92.

February events
 February – Electro-Motive Corporation introduces the E5.

March events
 March 29 – Southern Pacific Railroad runs its last passenger train to Fremont-Centerville, California.

May events
 May 1 – The Østfold Line in Norway takes electric traction into use between Dilling and Fredrikstad.
 May 20 – Sixty-six railroads in the United States, in cooperation with the Travelers' Credit Corporation, begin selling railroad tickets, Pullman accommodations and all-expense tours on an installment basis, known as the Travel Credit Plan. Purchases over $50 can be charged.

June events
 June 21 – East Wind begins summer service over the Pennsylvania, New Haven, Boston & Maine and Maine Central railroads between Washington, D.C. and Maine.
 June 29 – Syracuse Transit Corporation closes the South Salina and Nedrow lines in Syracuse, New York.
 June 30 – Last day archbar freight trucks can legally operate in U.S. Interchange service (and then only on empty cars returning to their home roads).
 June – Chicago, Rock Island and Pacific Railroad takes delivery of the unique EMC AB6 locomotives.

July events
 July 1 – Portions of the SNCF in Alsace-Lorraine are incorporated into the Deutsche Reichsbahn.
 July 15 – The Østfold Line in Norway takes electric traction into use between Fredrikstad and Sarpsborg.
 July 17 – The last section of the Baghdad Railway's mainline linking Istanbul and Baghdad is completed between El Yaroubieh and Baiji and the Compagnie Internationale des Wagons-Lits' Taurus Express begins to run throughout between Haydarpaşa Terminal, Istanbul, and Baghdad Central Station.
 July 29 – Rail traffic is suspended in France between French-retained and German-occupied territories.
 July 30 – The Pennsylvania Railroad orders its first 4-4-4-4 T1 duplex-drive steam locomotives. They are expected to be serious competition for diesel power.

August events
 August 1 – Norwegian State Railways runs first through train on the Flåm Line.

September events
 September 2 – Kansas City Southern Railway inaugurates the Southern Belle passenger train service between Kansas City, Missouri, and New Orleans, Louisiana.
 September 13 – The Gulf, Mobile and Ohio Railroad is formed by the merger of the Gulf, Mobile and Northern and Mobile and Ohio Railroads.

October events
 October 1 – The Pennsylvania Turnpike opens, constructed using tunnels and grades originally built for the never-completed South Pennsylvania Railroad.

November events
 November 4 – Norton Fitzwarren, England: a train driver on the Great Western Railway misreads the signals on a four track line, and drives his train off the end of the track.
 November 11 
 The Østfold Line in Norway takes electric traction into use between Sarpsborg and Halden.
 Syracuse Transit Corporation closes the Elm Street line in Syracuse, New York.
 November 22 – The Newark City Subway in New Jersey opens an extension from Heller Parkway to Grove Street.

December
 December 15 – The IND Sixth Avenue Line of the New York City Subway is completed and opened throughout.
 December 17 – The Florida East Coast Railway introduces the Dixie Flagler passenger train between Chicago, Illinois and Miami, Florida, replacing the Henry M. Flagler.

Deaths

September deaths 
 September 23 – Hale Holden, president of Chicago, Burlington and Quincy Railroad 1914–1918 and 1920–1929, chairman of the board of directors for Southern Pacific Railroad 1932–1939, dies (b. 1869).

October deaths 
 October 24 – William Benson Storey, president of Atchison, Topeka and Santa Fe Railway 1920–1933 (born 1857).

November deaths 
 November 9 – Charles Langbridge Morgan, chief engineer for London, Brighton and South Coast Railway, dies (b. 1855).

Unknown date deaths 
 Leonor F. Loree, president of Baltimore and Ohio Railroad 1901–1903, Delaware and Hudson Railway 1907–1938 and Kansas City Southern Railway 1918-1920 (born 1858).

Accidents

References